Isaac Schneersohn (1879 or 18811969) was a French rabbi, industrialist, and the founder of the first Holocaust Archives and Memorial.  He emigrated from Ukraine to France after the First World War.

In 1943 while under Italian wartime occupation, Schneersohn founded a documentation center at his home in Grenoble with representatives from 40 Jewish organizations. The center moved to Paris at Liberation and became the Center of Contemporary Jewish Documentation.  Schneersohn remained President of the CDJC and editor of its Revue until his death in 1969.

Biography

Early life 

Isaac Schneersohn was born in Kamenetz-Podolsk, currently in the Ukraine, in 1879 or 1881.

Schneersohn served as a crown rabbi in Horodnia and Chernihiv in northern Ukraine.  He was active both socially and politically, becoming involved in community affairs and education, as well as becoming a council member and deputy mayor in Ryazan as a member of the moderate liberal party.

Emigration to France 

Originally from the Russian Empire, Isaac Schneersohn emigrated to France in 1920 after the Bolshevik revolution. He was naturalized as a French citizen during the inter-wars years.

In Paris, "His home became a place where Jewish leaders met, many of them Zionists, mostly right-wing Revisionists, as he had become."

Family 

Schneersohn had a brother, Dr. Fishel Schneerson and three sons: Boris, Arnold, and Michel, who were mobilized as reserve officers in the French Army. Boris and Arnold were captured and interned at the disciplinary camp at Lübeck. Michel was liberated in August 1940. He then took part in the fight as a member of the Dordogne Maquis.

Career 

A descendant of a long line of rabbis and a rabbi by training, Schneersohn decided to go into industry.

He founded the documentation center CDJC in 1943 while in Grenoble, moved it to Paris, and remained director until his death.  See section Center of Contemporary Jewish Documentation below.

World War II 

When World War II broke out, he left Paris for Bordeaux, with his family. In 1941, he settled in Mussidan in the Dordogne.

He was active in the Union générale des israélites de France (UGIF, General Organization of Jews in France). As such, he made numerous trips to Grenoble, where in 1942 the idea grew to create a "Center of Jewish Documentation", which later became the Center of Contemporary Jewish Documentation.

The work of the CDJC was interrupted by the German invasion of the Italian zone in September 1943. The members of the CDJC took refuge in the underground. Isaac Schneersohn and Léon Poliakov got back to Paris at the time of the insurrection of August 1944. They succeeded to seize the archives of the Commissariat-General for Jewish Affairs  of the archives of the German Embassy in Paris, of the staff headquarters, and especially of the Anti-Jewish department of the Gestapo.

Death 

Schneersohn died in Paris on June 25, 1969 at the age of 88 or 90.

On January 27, 2005, the occasion of the 60th anniversary commemoration of the liberation of the Auschwitz concentration camp, Schneersohn was remembered by Éric de Rothschild, President of the Mémorial de la Shoah, by the Mayor of Paris, Bertrand Delanoë, and by President of the French Republic, Jacques Chirac.  Chirac said that "Isaac Schneersohn was the archivist of the spirit against the bureaucracy of barbarism."

Center of Contemporary Jewish Documentation

CDJC 
In 1946, Schneersohn became President of the Center of Contemporary Jewish Documentation (CDJC) and editor of the Revue published by the center, until 1969.

On October 8, 1958, the future Nobel Peace Prize laureate René Cassin presented him with the Cross of the Knight of the Legion of Honor.

His son Arnold became honorary treasurer of the Center after the war. When captive in the Oflag, he had organized a pocket of resistance, which earned him a transfer to the discipline Oflag of Lübeck.

In Paris, he was close to Rabbi David Feuerwerker, who took part in the annual ceremonies at the CDJC on numerous occasions in the presence of the authorities. When Rabbi Feuerwerker became the rabbi of a synagogue in the 15th arrondissement of Paris, Schneersohn and his son Arnold were members of his community.

Schneersohn was synonymous with the CDJC. He personified the institution, which continues to have an important influence worldwide.

The founding meeting in Grenoble 
Schneersohn hosted a meeting April 28, 1943 at his residence in Grenoble which was then under Italian occupation to create a Jewish "documentation center" to collect documents and testimony on the situation of Jews during the war.  He invited forty delegates of Jewish organizations including Jacob Gordin to the founding meeting.

Without knowing whether he or any of them would even survive the war, Schneersohn was motivated by a desire to accumulate and preserve materials and to write about everything that was happening, as building blocks for historians who would come later.

Foundation of the CDJC 
To accumulate testimonies on the Shoah, Schneersohn together with Léon Poliakov devoted himself to collect documents which served the history of the Jews during the war. The group organized around Schneersohn and Poliakov returned to Paris, during the Liberation of Paris of August 1944, taking possession of the archives of the Commissariat-General for Jewish Affairs of the Vichy Regime, of those of the German Embassy in Paris, of the German staff headquarters, and of the Anti-Jewish archives of the Gestapo in Paris.

Related institutions 
In 1944, the CDJC was thus transferred to Paris. It settled in Le Marais, practically in the Pletzl, the old Jewish neighborhood, an evident symbolism.

The Mémorial du martyr juif inconnu was inaugurated on October 30, 1956.

In 1997, the decision was taken to merge the two institutions: the CDJC and the Mémorial du martyr juif inconnu, to form the Mémorial de la Shoah, which opened on January 27, 2005.

Publications

See also
 Center of Contemporary Jewish Documentation
 The Holocaust in France
 The Holocaust

Notes

Sources

, original French edition
, second French edition

References

External links 

19th-century births
Year of birth uncertain
1969 deaths
Jews in the French resistance
20th-century French rabbis
French Orthodox rabbis
Hasidic rabbis in Europe
Ukrainian Hasidic rabbis
French people of Ukrainian-Jewish descent
Schneersohn family
Chabad-Lubavitch rabbis